Victorithyris is a genus of brachiopod from southern Australia. It lived during the Eocene to Miocene period.

References 

Terebratulida
Prehistoric brachiopod genera
Eocene brachiopods
Miocene brachiopods
Cenozoic brachiopods
Prehistoric animals of Australia
Prehistoric invertebrates of Oceania
Fossils of Australia